Josua Tuisova Ratulevu (born 4 February 1994) is a Fijian rugby union player. A wing or centre, he currently plays for Lyon in France's Top 14. He won a gold medal in sevens as part of the Fiji team at the 2016 Rio Olympics. Known for his strong running and physical play, he is nicknamed "Human Bulldozer"and "The Bus".

He began his career in Fiji playing sevens for Westfield Barbarians, captained by his older brother and ex-Fiji sevens player, Pio Tuwai. He made his international sevens debut for Fiji in the 2013 Wellington Sevens against Scotland at rover.

In July 2013, he was signed by French Top 14 club RC Toulonnais (Toulon). He made his debut against Racing Métro 92 in August, and scored his first try against Bayonne. In May 2015, he signed a four-year deal to stay at Toulon.

Honours
 Winner of the 2013–14 Top 14
 Winner of the 2013–14 Heineken Cup
 Winner of the 2014–15 ERC Cup
 Olympic Gold Medallist for Fiji sevens at the 2016 Rio Olympics.

References

External links

 
 Lyon OU profile
 ERC Rugby profile

1994 births
RC Toulonnais players
Lyon OU players
Living people
Fijian rugby union players
Rugby union wings
Rugby union centres
People from Ba Province
Fijian expatriate rugby union players
Expatriate rugby union players in France
Fijian expatriate sportspeople in France
Rugby sevens players at the 2016 Summer Olympics
Olympic rugby sevens players of Fiji
Fiji international rugby sevens players
Olympic gold medalists for Fiji
Male rugby sevens players
Olympic medalists in rugby sevens
Medalists at the 2016 Summer Olympics
Fiji international rugby union players
People from Yasawa